Scopula scotti is a moth of the  family Geometridae. It is found in Ethiopia.

Subspecies
Scopula scotti scotti
Scopula scotti turlini Herbulot, 1978

References

Moths described in 1937
scotti
Moths of Africa